Najafabad (also Romanized as Najafābād) is a village in Sar Firuzabad Rural District, Firuzabad District, Kermanshah County, Kermanshah Province, Iran. At the 2006 census, its population was 422, in 83 families.

References 

Populated places in Kermanshah County